The Windfall Harbor Shelter Cabin is a historic backcountry shelter in the Admiralty Island National Monument, part of the Tongass National Forest in Southeast Alaska.  It was one of a number of such facilities built by Civilian Conservation Corps (CCC) on the Admiralty Island Canoe Route between 1933 and 1937.  This cabin, a three-sided Adirondack-style log structure with shake walls and roof, is located near the southern end of Windfall Harbor, an inlet on the east side of Admiralty Island.  The shelter underwent repairs in 1986.  The Forest Service is in 2014 in the planning phases of a project to relocate the cabin a short distance to move it away from a major bear travel path.

The cabin was listed on the National Register of Historic Places in 1995.

See also
National Register of Historic Places listings in Hoonah-Angoon Census Area, Alaska

References

Park buildings and structures on the National Register of Historic Places in Alaska
Buildings and structures completed in 1936
Log cabins in the United States
Tongass National Forest
Civilian Conservation Corps in Alaska
Buildings and structures on the National Register of Historic Places in Hoonah–Angoon Census Area, Alaska
Log buildings and structures on the National Register of Historic Places in Alaska
1936 establishments in Alaska